Balatonvilágos is the northernmost as well as the easternmost village of Somogy county, Hungary.

External links 
 Official website 
 Street map 
 Balatonvilágos at funiq.hu

References 

Populated places in Somogy County